László Sebők (13 November 1937 – 29 September 2012) was a Hungarian boxer. He competed at the 1960 Summer Olympics and the 1964 Summer Olympics. At the 1964 Summer Olympics, he lost to Eddie Davies of Ghana.

References

1937 births
2012 deaths
Hungarian male boxers
Olympic boxers of Hungary
Boxers at the 1960 Summer Olympics
Boxers at the 1964 Summer Olympics
Boxers from Budapest
Welterweight boxers